F.E.A.R. (Forgotten, Enslaved, Admired, Released) is the fifth studio album by German power metal band Dawn of Destiny, released 7 March 2014. The album is based on a concept story, divided into 4 acts, which focuses on the tragic fate of a young girl. The story tells of a girl who sits in a wheelchair by a car accident caused by her own mother and in addition also lives a tragic life.

Track listing

Personnel

Dawn Of Destiny 
Jens Faber – bass, lead vocals, backing vocals, piano, orchestration, lyrics, engineering, producer
Dirk Raczkiewicz – keyboards, synthesizer
Veith Offenbächer – rhythm guitars, acoustic guitars, lead guitars, solo guitars, engineering
Jeanette Scherff – lead vocals, backing vocals

Guest musicians 
Hjördis Faber – additional vocals (track 1)
John Sagias – drums, percussion
Jon Oliva – lead vocals (track 6)
Mats Levén – lead vocals (track 1)

Production and design 
Dennis Köhne – mixing, mastering
Dominik Tolksdorf – lyrical assistance
Dirk Schelpmeier – photography
Felipe Machado Franco – cover art, design

References 

Dawn of Destiny albums
2014 albums